The Advertiser News is a weekly newspaper in Spring Hill, Tennessee. It is owned and published by  GateHouse Media Inc. The newspaper is published once a week, every Wednesday. Its Newspaper Designated Market (N.D.M.) stretches into two cities in two separate counties in Middle Tennessee. It is primarily distributed to zip code 37174 Spring Hill (both the Maury County, Tennessee side and the Williamson County, Tennessee side and zip code 37179 Thompson's Station, Tennessee. It is a Total Market Coverage (T.M.C.) paper and is delivered to 99% of all deliverable mailing addresses in those zip codes. It is the only newspaper that reaches both sides of Spring Hill with full saturation. Two daily papers are distributed in Spring Hill but one primarily on the Williamson County side and one primarily on the Maury County side.

History 
The Advertiser News was founded in 2003 by Jeff Bryant. Jeff, along with his wife Karen Bryant and Advertising Representative David Hancock, were the driving force in creating and publishing the newspaper. The very first edition was published in October 2003. At the time the newspaper was a tabloid and was printed every two weeks. The newspaper was actually started in the attic office space of local Spring Hill attorney Amy Cross.

In June 2004, The Advertiser News Group was formed as a holding company and started a sister publication called Brentwood Life. It was followed five months later by the first publication of the Franklin Life in November 2004.

The Advertiser News Group was purchased by Stephens Media in July 2005. Stephen Media also owns The Columbia Daily Herald, and many other publications around the country. On February 19, 2015, the company announced it had sold its Stephens Media newspapers to the New Media Investment Group, a publicly traded company based in New York for $102.5 million in cash. The deal closed in April 2015, GateHouse Media manages this newspaper as well as 140 Daily and 475 weekly newspapers in 37 states.

In mid-2017 The Advertiser News hired Chris Yow from Alabama as its Managing Editor and brought in Craig Duncan as the General Manager from their sister paper in Columbia, Tennessee.

Subsidiary Publications 
 Spring Hill Life  {Quarterly} (Spring Hill, TN)
 Maury Life  {Quarterly} (Columbia, TN)

References

External links 
 The Advertiser News official Web Site
 The Daily Herald official web site
 GateHouse Media official web site

Newspapers published in Tennessee
Maury County, Tennessee